Latin American television awards are or were given by several organizations for contributions in various fields of television in Latin America.

General

Platino Awards, Ibero-America's annual film awards presented by Federación Iberoamericana de Productores Cinematográficos y Audiovisuales (FIPCA), established in 2013. Includes awards for Best Miniseries or TV series, Best Actor in a Miniseries or TV series and Best Actress in a Miniseries or TV series. See :Category:Platino Awards.
 Platino Award for Best Director
 Platino Award for Best Ibero-American Film
 Platino Honorary Award
 Platino Award for Best Actor
 Platino Award for Best Actress

Argentina

Clarín Awards. Sponsored since 1998 by the Argentine newspaper Clarín. Honors Argentine achievements in entertainment, sports, literature, and advertising.
Martín Fierro Awards. Given since 1959 by the Association of Argentine Television and Radio Journalists (APTRA).
Tato Awards. Released since 2009 by the Cámara Argentina de Productoras Independientes de Televisión (CAPIT). The award is named after the late Tato Bores.

Brazil

Meus Prêmios Nick. Presented since 2000 by Nickelodeon (Brazil), a local version of Nickelodeon Kids' Choice Awards.
Prêmio Extra de Televisão de melhor telenovela. Presented since 1998 by Jornal Extra, a category of the Prêmio Extra de Televisão, awarded to the best telenovela on Brazilian television.
Troféu Imprensa. Presented annually since 1958 by Sistema Brasileiro de Televisão (SBT) to honor the best Brazilian television productions, including telenovelas.

Chile

 Caleuche Awards. For the best acting performances in movies, television serials, series and miniseries, and comedies. Organized by the Corporation of Actors of Chile (Chileactores), in conjunction with VTR (telecom company).

Colombia

Cartagena Film Festival (Festival Internacional de Cine de Cartagena de Indias: FICCI). Held in Cartagena, Colombia. Promotes Colombian television series, Latin American films and short films. Founded in 1959 by Victor Nieto.
Premios Nuestra Tierra (Our Country Award). Since 2007. Similar to the Latin Grammy Award for music, but restricted to Colombia. Includes "Best Music for TV".

Mexico

Premios TVyNovelas. Presented since 1983 by Televisa and the magazine TVyNovelas to honor the best Mexican television productions, including telenovelas. See :Category:TVyNovelas Awards.

Paraguay  
 Luis Alberto del Paraná Award. Presented by media business JCA Producciones for achievements in Paraguayan radio and television.

United States

Premios Juventud. Presented by the Univision television network. For young Spanish-speaking celebrities in the areas of film, music, sports, fashion, and pop culture.

Uruguay

 Iris Award (Uruguay). Presented by the newspaper El País for achievements in Uruguayan radio and television.

See also

 List of television awards

References

 
Latin American